Foulweather Bluff is a privately owned protected area and a cliff that lies on the north end of the Kitsap Peninsula along Puget Sound, on the east side of the entrance to the Hood Canal.

Landform

Foulweather Bluff was named by George Vancouver in 1792, due to the rough weather he experienced there.

Preserve
The Foulweather Bluff Nature Preserve was established in 1967 by the Nature Conservancy after the bulk of the land on which it's currently located was donated to the organization by its then owner, Errol Rawson, with smaller allotments contributed by Rawson's neighbors. The preserve consists of the cliff and the beach it overlooks, as well as adjoining marsh and alder and coniferous forest. It shelters a large number of plant and animals species, notably wintering ducks. A trail leads from the nearest road to the beach.

See also
 Hansville, Washington

References

Headlands of Washington (state)
Landforms of Kitsap County, Washington
Landforms of Puget Sound